The Palumbanes or Palumbanes Islands, also known locally as “Parompong” (Porongpong), is a group of islands in the Philippine Sea located in the northern part of Caramoran, province of Catanduanes, Bicol Region, Philippines.

Palumbanes is accessible by motorboat and is less than an hour away or 13km away from the shoreline of the municipality of Caramoran. The islands are picture-perfect especially during summer. It has the view of a beautiful sunrise, green-contoured mountains, smiling children, and great off-white sand. It is considered as the fishing paradise of the north.

The group of island is composed of 3 islands named Parongpong Island, the largest followed by Tignob Island and Calabagio Island and rocks

Geography

See also
 Caramoran, Catanduanes
 Catanduanes, Philippines
 Catanduanes State University

Notes
  Palumbanes Islands - The Grand Adventure Nobody's Talking About

References

Islands of Catanduanes